Frans Reyniers (27 June 1928 – 17 August 1996) was a Belgian footballer. He played in two matches for the Belgium national football team in 1952.

References

External links
 

1928 births
1996 deaths
Belgian footballers
Belgium international footballers
Place of birth missing
Association football midfielders